"Can't Take My Eyes Off You" is a 1967 song written by Bob Crewe and Bob Gaudio. It was recorded as a single by Frankie Valli. The song was among his biggest hits, earning a gold record and reaching No. 2 on the Billboard Hot 100 for a week. Gaudio was a bandmate of Valli's in the Four Seasons. It was Valli's biggest solo hit until he hit No. 1 in 1975 with "My Eyes Adored You".

Gaudio, an original member of the Four Seasons, refers to "Eyes" as "the one that almost got away" until Windsor, Ontario, radio station CKLW (a station also serving the Detroit metro on the American side of the border) intervened. In 1967, the record's producers urged Paul Drew, program director at the legendary station, to consider the tune for rotation. For much of the 1960s and 1970s, CKLW was credited with launching hit records via its powerful signal, blanketing the Great Lakes region. Drew didn't warm to the song at first, but accepted an invitation to hear it live at the Roostertail, where Valli was performing a weeklong stint with the Four Seasons. Drew liked what he heard and added the song to his station's playlist. "The switchboards lit up, and the rest, as they say, is history," Gaudio recalls.

"Can't Take My Eyes Off You" has been recorded in many other arrangements, many of which have charted in different countries. The song is a staple of television and film soundtracks, even being featured as part of the plot of some films. Valli's version was also used by NASA as a wake-up song on the STS-126 Space Shuttle mission, to celebrate the wedding anniversary of astronaut Christopher Ferguson, one of the mission's crew members.

Credits 
The song was written by Bob Crewe and Bob Gaudio. Melodic elements bear a similarity to passages from the Adagio of Spartacus and Phrygia section of the 1956 ballet Spartacus (Suite No. 2) by Aram Khachaturian.

The original recording, from an arrangement by Gaudio and Artie Schroeck, was made at A & R Studio 2 (formerly Columbia Studio A), at 799 7th Avenue in New York City, with Crewe producing and Phil Ramone engineering.

Reception
Billboard described the single as "strong rhythm ballad material from the pen of Bob Crewe and Bob Gaudio with an exceptional Valli vocal combined with an exciting Artie Schroeck arrangement." Cash Box called the single a "smooth, gentle, softly spoken romancer."

Charts

Weekly charts

Year-end charts

Certifications

Boys Town Gang version 

In 1982, San Francisco-based post-disco band Boys Town Gang performed a dance version of the song which reached the top spot in the Netherlands, Belgium, and Spain and number four in the United Kingdom. This version was also successful in Japan, receiving a gold digital certification by the RIAJ in 2011, and is also on games such as Just Dance 4.

Track listings
7" single
 "Can't Take My Eyes Off You" - 3:28	
 "Can't Take My Eyes Off You" (Reprise) - 4:42	
 		 	 
7" single
 "Can't Take My Eyes Off You" - 3:40	
 "Disco Kicks" - 4:04

Charts

Weekly charts

Year-end charts

Lauryn Hill version 

Lauryn Hill’s version of the song was recorded In 1997, while Hill was eight months pregnant with her first child. It was first featured in the movie Conspiracy Theory (1997). While the song wasn’t featured on the soundtrack, a radio jockey at KMEL in San Francisco put the song on a CD and began playing the song; more radio stations followed suit, causing a domino effect around the U.S., ultimately leading the song to peak at number two on the Rhythmic Top 40 chart, despite Hill's label's not releasing the song as a single. Due to the popularity of the song it was added as a hidden track on The Miseducation of Lauryn Hill.

This version was also nominated for a Grammy Award for Best Female Pop Vocal Performance in 1999, becoming the first hidden track to ever receive a Grammy nomination. Consequence of Sound named it the best hidden track of all time. In 2014, VH1 also named it the best hidden track of all time. Academy Award–winning actor Forest Whitaker was inspired to name his daughter True, after hearing Hill's version of the song.

Charts

Other cover versions 
The song has been recorded by many artists. Among the most notable examples are the following:
 In late 1967, the Lettermen recorded the "Can't Take My Eyes Off You" as a medley with "Goin' Out of My Head".  Their rendition reached number 7 on the U.S. Billboard Hot 100 and number 2 Easy Listening.
 In 1968, A version by Andy Williams made it to number 5 on the UK singles chart and number 8 on the Irish Singles Chart. The arranger and producer was Nick DeCaro and the conductor was Eddie Karam.  In 2002 he recorded a new version of the song, as a duet with British actress and singer Denise van Outen, which reached number 23 in the UK singles charts.
 In 1979, Maureen McGovern (number 27 on the US Adult Contemporary chart in 1979; number 5 Canadian AC in 1980).
 In 1991, Pet Shop Boys used part of the song on their version of U2's "Where the Streets Have No Name", which reached number 4 in the U.K. and number 72 in the U.S.
 In 1992, Dutch singers Gerard Joling and Tatjana Šimić recorded a duet version of the song (including a rap segment by Darrell Bell), which peaked at number 5 in the Dutch Top 40 charts.
Morten Harket of the Norwegian band A-ha recorded a cover version of the song, which was used as the soundtrack for the 1993 movie Coneheads.
In 1999, Heath Ledger's character, accompanied by his high school's marching band, sings a part of the song in the film 10 Things I Hate About You, for which he was nominated in the 2000 MTV Movie Awards for Best Musical Performance.
 In 2004, Jennifer Peña recorded a Latin version of the song, "No Hay Nadie Igual Como Tú", which reached number 33 on the Latin charts.
 In 2010, fans of the German football club 1. FC Union Berlin started using the melody for a chant for their player Torsten Mattuschka, inspired by Manchester United F.C. fans who used it for their player Owen Hargreaves.
 In 2011, Stereophonics frontman Kelly Jones sang an acoustic version of the song in tribute to former Wales national football team manager Gary Speed. The song was adopted as an anthem for Welsh football fans during Speed's playing career with Wales after being used in a BBC Wales promo for the 1994 World Cup qualifying campaign.
 In 2019, Surf Mesa remixed a cover version of the song as a single under the title "ILY (I Love You Baby)". The single reached the Top 40 in over 30 countries and is certified Platinum in six countries.

References

External links 
 Lyrics of this song
 "Official Frankie Valli Site". Retrieved 2010-2-16.
 RIAA - Gold & Platinum Searchable Database
 
 

1967 songs
1967 singles
1968 singles
1969 singles
1982 singles
Songs written by Bob Crewe
Songs written by Bob Gaudio
Frankie Valli songs
The Four Seasons (band) songs
Jay and the Americans songs
Andy Williams songs
Boys Town Gang songs
Lauryn Hill songs
Barry Manilow songs
The Lettermen songs
Nancy Wilson (jazz singer) songs
Schlager songs
Maureen McGovern songs
Tatjana Šimić songs
Oricon International Singles Chart number-one singles
Song recordings produced by Bob Crewe
Philips Records singles
Cashbox number-one singles
Dutch Top 40 number-one singles